The Cathedral of the Immaculate Conception is a 20th-century English Gothic revival church that serves as the cathedral of the Roman Catholic Archdiocese of Changsha. It is located in the Xiangchun Street, Kaifu District of Changsha, Hunan, China.

History
It was built in 1902, in the late Qing Dynasty, by Weng Mingde, who was an Italian Franciscan missionary, and was destroyed by chaos in 1910. Then it was rebuilt in 1911.

In 2002, it was listed as a "Historical and Cultural Sites Protected at the Provincial Level" by the Hunan government.

In December 2008, the church celebrated its first one hundred years.

Bishop
 Qu Ailin, born in May 1961, in Hengyang of Hunan province.

See also
List of cathedrals in China

References

External links

Christianity in Hunan
Churches in Changsha
Tourist attractions in Changsha
1902 establishments in China
20th-century Roman Catholic church buildings in China
Roman Catholic cathedrals in China
Roman Catholic churches completed in 1902